General elections were held in Gibraltar on 11 September 1964. The Association for the Advancement of Civil Rights remained the largest party in the legislature, winning five of the eleven seats.

Electoral system
The legislature was elected by single transferable vote.

Results

References

Gibraltar
General
General elections in Gibraltar
Election and referendum articles with incomplete results
September 1964 events in Europe